Shropham Hall is an early Georgian country house in Shropham in the county of Norfolk. It was completed by 1729 for John Barker, later High Sheriff of Norfolk. It was later the home of Sir Edward Grogan, 2nd Baronet. The hall is listed Grade II on the National Heritage List for England.

References

Country Life article 24 February 2005, Pevsner Norfolk 2: North-west and South 1999, Burke's and Savills Guide to Country Houses: Volume III - East Anglia 1981

External links
Country Life article

1729 establishments in England
Breckland District
Country houses in Norfolk
Georgian architecture in England
Grade II listed buildings in Norfolk
Grade II listed houses
Houses completed in 1729